Malva is a genus of plants.

Malva may also refer to:
 Malva, Roman name for the Moulouya River
 Malva (Dacia), Dacian settlement in present-day Romania, where the Roman city of Romula was built.
 Malva, Zamora, a Spanish municipality of Castile and León
 Malwa, an alternative spelling for the Indian region and former state
 the pseudonym of Syrian artist Omar Hamdi
 Malva pudding, a South African sweet pudding
 Malva, a fictional character from Pokémon X and Y
 Malva (1924 film), a German silent film
 Malva (1957 film), a Russian drama film

See also